Anne McGrath (born ) is the National Director of the New Democratic Party (NDP) of Canada. Prior to this, she most recently served as principal secretary to former Alberta Premier Rachel Notley and as Notley's deputy chief of staff. McGrath was president of the New Democratic Party from 2006 to 2009.

Background
McGrath was born in Aldershot, England to Irish parents. Her family moved to Montreal when she was a child and later to Ottawa. Her father was a school principal and her mother was a teacher.

She studied English literature at the University of Ottawa and in 1979–80 she was President of the Student Federation of the University of Ottawa.

After graduating, she moved to Edmonton to work as a field organizer for the Alberta Federation of Students while studying for an education degree at the University of Alberta and became politically active.

She graduated with a Bachelor of Education from the University of Alberta and began her career as a teacher. She then held a variety of positions with not-for-profit organizations including working as Canadian Programme Officer for Oxfam-Canada and Community Development Team Leader and senior education officer for the Canadian Mental Health Association. She has a master's degree in communications studies. She has worked as a managing director at the lobbying firm Ensight, and is an associate at the public relations firm Hill+Knowlton Strategies. She has also served as a board member and social issues chair of the Elizabeth Fry Society, Vice-President of National Action Committee on the Status of Women, and a member of the Steering Committee for the Canadian Feminist Alliance for International Action: Beijing and Beyond.

McGrath is a frequent commentator on national media broadcasts and has been identified as one of the 100 most influential people in government and politics in Ottawa. She has been an activist in the labour, student and women's movements  and had been employed by CUPE National as Director of Equality and as executive assistant to CUPE's national president Judy Darcy, and by Oxfam Canada.

Politics
In the 1984 federal election, while a student, she ran as candidate for the Communist Party of Canada in Edmonton—Strathcona, placing seventh. Of her involvement with the Communist Party she says "I was young, probably naïve, interested in talking about politics. And very influenced by friends and teachers.". At a debate at the Calgary Varsity Centre in April 2019, McGrath apologised for her past involvement with the Communist Party saying she was no longer a Communist stating, "Four decades ago when I was a young student, I was a member [of the Communist Party] and I deeply regret that. It was a mistake and I'm very sorry."

In 1993, McGrath was the Alberta New Democratic Party's candidate in Calgary-Bow. In 1995 she was its candidate in a provincial by-election in Calgary-McCall and came in third place. In 1995, she unsuccessfully challenged Ross Harvey for the leadership of the Alberta New Democratic Party.

McGrath was president of the New Democratic Party from 2006 to 2009; she was elected on September 10, 2006, at the party's convention in Quebec City and her term ended on August 16, 2009 when Peggy Nash was elected president at the party's convention in Halifax. Before that, she had been director of operations for the NDP federal caucus.

As Chief of Staff to Jack Layton (2008–2011), she is credited with professionalizing caucus operations and with helping organize the party's historic breakthrough to Official Opposition status. She stayed on as chief of staff to interim party leader Nycole Turmel and the federal NDP Caucus, during Turmel's interim leadership.

McGrath also served as the National Director of the New Democratic Party (NDP) of Canada (2014-2015).

McGrath served as principal secretary to former Alberta Premier Rachel Notley and as Notley's deputy chief of staff.

McGrath was the NDP candidate in Calgary-Varsity in the 2019 Alberta general election.

She was portrayed by Wendy Crewson in the 2013 CBC Television film Jack.

Electoral record

2019 Alberta general election - Calgary-Varsity

1995 Alberta NDP leadership challenge
(Held on November 11, 1995)
Ross Harvey 177
Anne McGrath 118
Joe Weykowich 30
Lawrence Dubrofsky 3

1995 Calgary provincial by-election

1993 general election Calgary-Bow

In 1993, McGrath was the Alberta New Democratic Party's candidate in Calgary-Bow.

References

Canadian political consultants
Living people
Alberta New Democratic Party candidates in Alberta provincial elections
Women in Alberta politics
Presidents of the New Democratic Party of Canada
Political chiefs of staff
1958 births
English emigrants to Canada
University of Ottawa alumni
Communist Party of Canada (Ontario) politicians
People from Aldershot
Canadian people of Irish descent
Canadian communists
Canadian socialist feminists
Oxfam people
Canadian Union of Public Employees people
University of Alberta alumni